Flory–Stockmayer theory is a theory governing the cross-linking and gelation of step-growth polymers. The Flory-Stockmayer theory represents an advancement from the Carothers equation, allowing for the identification of the gel point for polymer synthesis not at stoichiometric balance. The theory was initially conceptualized by Paul Flory in 1941 and then was further developed by Walter Stockmayer in 1944 to include cross-linking with an arbitrary initial size distribution.
The Flory-Stockmayer theory was the first theory investigating percolation processes. Flory–Stockmayer theory is a special case of random graph theory of gelation.

History 
Gelation occurs when a polymer forms large interconnected polymer molecules through cross-linking. In other words, polymer chains are cross-linked with other polymer chains to form an infinitely large molecule, interspersed with smaller complex molecules, shifting the polymer from a liquid to a network solid or gel phase. The Carothers equation is an effective method for calculating the degree of polymerization for stoichiometrically balanced reactions. However, the Carothers equation is limited to branched systems, describing the degree of polymerization only at the onset of cross-linking. The Flory-Stockmayer Theory allows for the prediction of when gelation occurs using percent conversion of initial monomer and is not confined to cases of stoichiometric balance. Additionally, the Flory-Stockmayer Theory can be used to predict whether gelation is possible through analyzing the limiting reagent of the step-growth polymerization.

Flory’s assumptions 
In creating the Flory-Stockmayer Theory, Flory made three assumptions that affect the accuracy of this model. These assumptions were:
 	All functional groups on a branch unit are equally reactive
 	All reactions occur between A and B
 	There are no intramolecular reactions
As a result of these assumptions, a conversion slightly higher than that predicted by the Flory-Stockmayer Theory is commonly needed to actually create a polymer gel. Since steric hindrance effects prevent each functional group from being equally reactive and intramolecular reactions do occur, the gel forms at slightly higher conversion.

General case 

The Flory-Stockmayer Theory predicts the gel point for the system consisting of three types of monomer units
linear units with two A-groups (concentration ), 
linear units with two B groups  (concentration ),
branched A units (concentration ).
The following definitions are used to formally define the system
 is the number of reactive functional groups on the branch unit (i.e. the functionality of that branch unit)
 is the  probability that A has reacted (conversion of A groups)
 is the  probability that B has reacted (conversion of B groups)
 is the ratio of number of A groups in the branch unit to the total number of A groups
  is the ratio between total number of A and B groups. So that 
The theory states that the gelation occurs only if , where

.
the critical values of  that admit gelation. Thus gelation occurs if
 
alternatively, the same condition for  reads,

The both inequalities are equivalent and one may use the one that is more convenient.

Trifunctional A monomer with difunctional B monomer 

Since all the A functional groups are from the trifunctional monomer, ρ = 1 and 

Therefore, gelation occurs when 

or when,

Similarly, gelation occurs when

References

Polymer chemistry